The Jewish cemetery of Kleinbardorf began operations in 1574 on the so-called Steilen or Wartberg southeast of Kleinbardorf, in northern Bavaria. The area is now known only as Judenhügel (Jewish hills).

The cemetery is located within an early Middle Ages ring wall approximately 1.5 Kilometers long.

The grounds has a total area of 21,050 square meters. In 1987 there were approximately 4400 gravestones and in 1933 there were approximately 20,000 gravestones. The cemetery is the second largest Jewish cemetery in Bavaria, the largest being Munich.

History 
The family history of the Bibra family records 1574 as the beginning of the cemetery under George Christof von Bibra and the fees are spelled out.

In 1696/97 Jospe Neustatt paid for the construction of a Tahara House (mortuary) with a stone roof and a stone ritual purification table.  In 1964 it was renovated by the citizens of Kleinbardorf.

In 1769, the Jewish community purchased the cemetery and expanded it and by a further land acquisition in 1843 it reached its present size.

The cemetery was desecrated in 1925, between 1933 and 1945, in 1957 and again in 1977.
The cemetery was renovated.  In 1988 the German Government awarded Mr. Hermann the 'Order of Merit' decoration for his maintenance of the cemetery.
Besides serving Kleinbardorf, it also served 27 neighbouring Jewish communities as a burial ground, including those from Bastheim, Eichenhausen, Höchheim, Kleineibstadt, Königshofen, Poppenlauer, Rödelmaier, Trappstadt, Unsleben, Massbach and Oberlauringen. The burial register from 1759 to 1938 is still in existence today, as are chronicles of burials between 1800 and 1938.

Local Jewish population locations and trends

Women’s graves
Right of the southwest entrance is a section for women who died in childbirth.

Memorial
In the cemetery there is a Memorial for Jewish fallen of the World War I.

Gallery

References

External links 

 Jüdischer Friedhof Kleinbardorf bei www.alemannia-judaica.de
 International Jewish Cemetery Project
 synagogenprojekt.de

Literature 
 WILHELM FRHR. VON BIBRA, Beiträge zur Familien Geschichte der Reichsfreiherrn von Bibra, Zweiter Band (vol. 2), 1882; page 394 Footnote 2  Digitized copy Universitäts- und Landesbibliothek Düsseldorf

Kleinbardorf
Protected areas of Bavaria
Buildings and structures in Rhön-Grabfeld
Cemetery vandalism and desecration
1574 establishments in the Holy Roman Empire